Beppo is a diminutive of the given name Giuseppe. It may refer to:


People

Given name
 Beppo Brem (1906–1990), German actor
 Beppo Levi (1875–1961), Italian mathematician

Nickname
 Beppo Mauhart (1933–2017), Austrian business executive
 Giuseppe Occhialini (1907–1993), Italian physicist
 Beppo Römer (1892–1944), German politician
 Joseph Schmid (1901–1956), German World War II general

Other uses
 Beppo (comics), a fictional monkey in the DC Comics universe
 Beppo (poem), an 1818 poem by Lord Byron
 Beppo Station, a Japanese railway station
 Beppo Shrine, a noteworthy high ranking Shinto Shrine

See also
 Bepo (disambiguation)
 Beppe, another diminutive of Giuseppe
 Buca di Beppo

Masculine given names
Lists of people by nickname